Kripashankar Singh is an Indian politician with the Bharatiya Janata Party. He was a minister of state in the 2004 Maharashtra state cabinet while in Indian National Congress. He was instrumental in Congress gains in Mumbai against Shiv Sena in the 2009 Maharashtra assembly elections. He was the president of the Mumbai chapter of the Indian National Congress party until June 2011. He won the santacruz constituency in the last Mumbai elections.

Life
Singh hails from Rajput family in Jaunpur Uttar Pradesh.

In earlier election depositions, he had claimed to be a B.Sc. graduate; from 2004 onwards, he acknowledged only having finished high school.

Many years ago, KripaShankar was working as a machine operator at a medicine company AFD (Aglo French Department) manufacturer of Bplex-Forte multivitamin.

He subsequently joined Congress and rose through the ranks to become a powerful figure by the 2004 elections, when he was assigned the cabinet seat as Minister of State for Home.

On 7 July 2021, Singh joined BJP. He had quit the Congress in 2019 over its decision to oppose NDA government’s policy on Jammu and Kashmir, he was looking for political rehabilitation. He had four options— to rejoin Congress or join NCP, Shiv Sena or BJP. After prolonged deliberations, he decided to join BJP.

Disproportionate assets investigation
In the 2008–09 period, several accounts held by Kripashankar's wife Maltidevi, and his son Narendra, showed deposits and transfers totaling Rs 65 crore. The enforcement directorate found no evidence linking him to Koda. However, the anti-corruption investigations revealed disproportionately large assets. Despite these assets, Congress kept supporting Kripashankar; it has been suggested that he is close to some aides of Congress President Sonia Gandhi.

In March 2011, it was revealed that in 2008–09, Shahid Balwa had channeled Rs 4.5 crores into an account held by Narendra and his wife. In the anti-corruption atmosphere of the time, Kripashankar had to resign. On 22 February 2012, the Bombay High Court directed the city police commissioner to prosecute Kripashankar Singh for "criminal misconduct" under the Prevention of Corruption Act, 1988.

References

Year of birth missing (living people)
Living people
Politicians from Mumbai
Indian National Congress politicians from Maharashtra
Maharashtra MLAs 2004–2009
Maharashtra MLAs 2009–2014
People from Jaunpur district
Marathi politicians
Bharatiya Janata Party politicians from Maharashtra